Thomas Byrne may refer to:

 Thomas Byrne (cricketer) (1866–1951), Australian cricketer
 Thomas Byrne (Dublin politician) (1917–1978), Irish politician
 Thomas Byrne (Meath politician) (born 1977), Irish politician
 Thomas Byrne (VC) (1866–1944), Irish British Army soldier
 Thomas R. Byrne (1923–2009), American politician
 Thomas Ryan Byrne (1923–2014), American diplomat
 Thomas Byrne, co-founder of SA Hauts-Fourneaux de Rodange in 1872
 Thomas Sebastian Byrne (1841–1923), American Roman Catholic bishop

See also 
 Tommy Byrne (disambiguation)
 Thomas Byrnes (disambiguation)